The Portrait of the Marchioness of Santa Cruz or Portrait of the Marquise of Santa Cruz is an 1805 portrait by the Spanish artist Francisco José de Goya y Lucientes, a family friend of the subject. It has been owned by the Museo del Prado since 1986, when it bought it from its previous owner for over US$6 million.

It shows Joaquina Téllez-Girón, Marquise of Santa Cruz clad in a very light white dress, lying sideways on a red divan. Her head is decorated with yellow flowers; her left hand is balancing a lyre-guitar. Her gaze does not directly fix on the viewer but seems to look distant. Her body does not seem to sit in a natural position, but seemingly floats on the red divan and the pillows. 

The theme seems almost allegorical, a reference to the ancient Greek theatre. The composition of the work is similar to Antonio Canova's sculpture of Paolina Borghese as Venus Victrix. The portrait is also similar to Diego Velázquez and, to an extent, to Titian's depictions of Venus. The flowers on her head are a reference to Bacchus, while the lyre-guitar with its resemblance to the ancient lyre is a homage to art and Apollo.

This painting inspired one pastiche or fantasy portrait depicted in the comedy film Mortdecai (2015), starring Johnny Depp and Gwyneth Paltrow.

See also
List of works by Francisco Goya

External links
http://www.almendron.com/arte/pintura/goya/obras_goya/goya_42.htm
http://www.museodelprado.es/coleccion/galeria-on-line/galeria-on-line/obra/la-marquesa-de-santa-cruz/

Paintings by Francisco Goya in the Museo del Prado
Portraits of women
Portrait of the Marchioness of Santa Cruz
Portraits by Francisco Goya
19th-century portraits